Tetyana Tereshchuk-Antipova (née Tereshchuk, born October 11, 1969), also spelled Tetiana Tereschuk-Antipova, is a female Ukrainian 400 m hurdler. She was born in Luhansk.

She won bronze at the 2004 Olympic Games, silver at the 1998 European Championships and bronze at the 2006 European Championships.

International competitions
 All results regarding 400 metres hurdles

References 
 
 Tetyana Tereshchuk-Antipova at Sporting-Heroes.net

1969 births
Living people
Ukrainian female hurdlers
Athletes (track and field) at the 1996 Summer Olympics
Athletes (track and field) at the 2000 Summer Olympics
Athletes (track and field) at the 2004 Summer Olympics
Olympic athletes of Ukraine
Olympic bronze medalists for Ukraine
European Athletics Championships medalists
Medalists at the 2004 Summer Olympics
Olympic bronze medalists in athletics (track and field)
Universiade medalists in athletics (track and field)
Goodwill Games medalists in athletics
Universiade gold medalists for Ukraine
Medalists at the 1997 Summer Universiade
Competitors at the 2001 Goodwill Games
Goodwill Games gold medalists in athletics
Sportspeople from Luhansk